Color Me Olsen is an 18-minute 2007 short independent film directed and written by Darren Stein. It was produced by Bryan Singer.

Plot
Bright-eyed 18-year-old identical twin brothers come to Hollywood with the age-old dream of becoming stars. When they see the performers in front of the world-famous Grauman's Chinese Theatre impersonating Superman, Dorothy and the Pirate Johnny, they think this could be their big break. Crossing the gender divide, they take on the roles of mega-famous twin sisters Mary-Kate and Ashley Olsen, losing themselves in their "roles" of the tween superstars, until their fabricated personas threaten to overtake their own identities forever.

Reviews
After its showing at the Tribeca Film Festival, reviewer Daniel Montgomery characterized the film as "ugly, depressing and vicious," asking "Why would anyone write this, direct it, star in it, or watch it? It’s reprehensible and should be punishable by heavy fines and jail time. Grade: F."

In contrast, online reviewer Scott Hoffman found the film "at first cheerfully amusing and entertaining," but concluded that it was "eerily similar to watching a great comedic sketch that's jettisoned to its punch line way too soon, with all the very important build up strangely absent."

San Francisco Chronicle critic David Wiegand was "not all that fond" of "a concept in search of smarter execution than you get here."

Another Tribeca reviewer, Ryan Stewart, described the film as one of two from Mood Enhancer (Tribeca's short films program) that "some will come away loving...There are a handful of genuine laughs in this one".

Cast
Kelsey Sanders as Mary-Kate Olsen
Jessica Amento	as Ashley Olsen
Ken Barnett as Superman
Kevin Berntson as Glitter Dad
Clint Catalyst as Oompa Loompa
Peggy Dunne as Glitter Woman
Edmund Entin as Ashley / Taylor
Gary Entin  as Mary-Kate / Hanson
Dana Galinsky as Tourist Daughter
Bruce Green as Pirate Johnny
S.A. Griffin as Tourist Dad
Liza Journo as Cupcake Girl
Paul Ryjin as Sand
Diane Salinger as Dorothy
Rachel Winfree as Tourist Mom

References

External links

2007 films
American short films
2007 short films
American independent films
Films produced by Bryan Singer
Films directed by Darren Stein
2000s American films